NNB may refer to:
 New Northwest Broadcasters, radio station broadcaster
 NamNamBulu, music band
 Non Non Biyori, anime and manga series